Dipsosaurus is a genus of lizards in the family Iguanidae.

Taxonomy
Currently, there are two described species in this genus.
 Desert iguana, Dipsosaurus dorsalis (Baird and Girard), 1852
 Catalina desert iguana, Dipsosaurus catalinensis (Van Denburgh, 1922)

References

Dipsosaurus
Lizard genera
Taxa named by Edward Hallowell (herpetologist)